Sada-E-Afghanistan ("Voice of Afghanistan", SATV) is a private television network based in Orange County, California that was launched in December 2010. The channel had studios in Irvine, California, Fremont, California and Toronto, Ontario, Canada, with plans to open one in Kabul, Afghanistan.

Programming on SATV focuses on  Afghan culture, such as music and politics.

On January 6, 2012, SATV stopped its satellite television service, but continues to broadcast through its website and on internet-based boxes such as Jadoo TV and GL Wiz.

References 

Afghan-American culture
Afghan Canadian
Television channels and stations established in 2010
Television stations in Afghanistan